Aughinish may refer to 
 Aughinish, County Clare
 Aughinish, County Limerick
Aughnish, County Donegal